Dalibor Karvay is a Slovak violinist and pedagogue at Musik und Kunst Privatuniversität der Stadt Wien.

Biography
Karvay was born on 24 July 1985 in Vrútky, Slovakia. At the age of three, he started playing the violin under the guidance of his father. During his studies at the Primary Art School in Vrútky, he made several recordings for the Slovak Radio in Bratislava. After the special study, under the guidance of professor Bohumil Urban, he graduated at the Žilina Conservatoire and from 1999 he studied at the Vienna at the Conservatoire in the class of the renowned professor Boris Kuschnir. He also took part in numerous masterclasses led by famous paedagogists - Euduard Grach, Mintscho Mintschev and Herman Krebbers.

In 2004 Karvay’s long-lasting and complicated search for the right instrument was shown in the international documentary Stradivari - Search for Perfection. Besides his concert career Karvay is teaching at the Music and Arts University of the city of Vienna.

Awards
His biggest successes include winning the Young Musicians meeting in Córdoba in 1996, Eurovision Young Musicians 2002, the first prize in the competition of Tibor Varga in 2003, the International Tribute of Young Interprets - New Talent in 2005 as well as his victory in the competition of David Oistrach in Moscow in 2008. Worthy of mentioning is also a concert for Prince Charles of Wales in the Windsor Castle in 2003 together with Mstislav Rostropovič. Karvay repeatedly accepted the invitation to Seiji Ozawa International Academy in Switzerland. 

He was awarded the Prize of the Minister of Culture of the Slovak Republic in 2009 for outstanding artistic performance and successful international representation of the Slovak interpretative art. The Foundation of Tatra Bank granted him the Young Creator Award in the music category.

Career
As a soloist he has worked with many renowned conductors such as Leif Segerstam, Ion Marin, Hiroyuki Iwaki, Jaap van Zweden, Marek Janowski, Alexander Rahbari, Roman Kofman, Benjamin Wallfisch, Ondrej Lenárd, Oliver Dohnányi, Leoš Svárovsky, etc. His cooperation with orchestras also makes an impressive Rundfunk-Symfonie Orchester Berlin, English Chamber Orchestra, Camerata Salzburg, Orchestra Ensemble Kanazawa, Czech Philharmonics, Nationaltheater-Orchester Mannheim, Radio-Symphonie Orchester Wien, Wiener Kammerorchester, Het Gelders Orkest, Solistes Européens Luxembourg, Slovak Philharmonics, Symphonic Orchestra of the Slovak Radio, state Chamber Orchestra Žilina, etc. He is also intensely involved in playing chamber music, collaborating with excellent musicians such as Radek Baborák, Julian Rachlin, Wenzel Fuchs, Boris Kuschnir, Daniel Buranovský and others.

References

External links

 

1985 births
Living people
Slovak violinists
21st-century violinists
Winners of Eurovision Young Musicians